Johann "Hans" Buzek (born 22 May 1938 in Wien) is a former Austrian football forward.

Club career
A goldsmith by profession, Buzek came through the youth ranks of First Vienna and stayed with them for 13 years. He also played for the other big capital sides Austria Wien, Wiener Sportclub and Rapid Wien. In 1969/1970 he got relegated with Dornbirn. After finishing his playing career with Austria Klagenfurt he became a full-time goldsmith in Baden bei Wien.

International career
He made his debut for Austria in an October 1955 match against Yugoslavia and earned a total of 42 caps, scoring 9 goals. Also, he was a participant at the 1958 FIFA World Cup.

Honours
Austrian Football Bundesliga (1):
 1955
Austrian Cup (2):
 1967, 1972
Austrian Bundesliga Top Goalscorer (2):
 1956, 1966

External links
  Player profile - Austria Wien archive
  Player profile - Rapid Wien archive

References

1938 births
Living people
Footballers from Vienna
Austrian footballers
Austria international footballers
1958 FIFA World Cup players
First Vienna FC players
FK Austria Wien players
SK Rapid Wien players
FC Kärnten players
Austrian Football Bundesliga players
Association football forwards